Doriprismatica sibogae is a species of sea slug, a dorid nudibranch, a shell-less marine gastropod mollusk in the family Chromodorididae.

Distribution 
This species is found in the tropical Pacific Ocean and is known from Indonesia, Fiji and French Polynesia.

Description  
Doriprismatica sibogae is very similar in appearance to Doriprismatica atromarginata, but can be distinguished from that species by the intense yellow colour of the mantle and foot. The black mantle edge is separated from the yellow of the back by a white line.

References

Chromodorididae
Gastropods described in 1905